The Western Sahara has an established music tradition. Many of the well-known from the country musicians have settled in Dakar, where they mingled further with musicians from West Africa.

Sahrawi music shares much in common with neighbouring musical traditions such as those of Mauritania and southern Morocco, yet retain aspects of pre-colonial heritage. The Tbal is the basic instrument of percussion, though the traditional string instrument called Tidinit, has largely been replaced by electric guitar.

The first Sahrawi music LP, titled Polisario vencerá, was recorded live in Barcelona, in 1982 by the band Shahid El Uali.

Some performers are tribespeople who have lived a nomadic existence, which is true of Mariem Hassan.

From 1998, Nubenegra (Spanish music label) marketed several Sahrawi music CDs in the United States and Germany, with a first release of  a three-disc box set from 1998 titled Sahrauis: The Music of the Western Sahara (catalogue number INT 32552). Featured artists in the compilation were singer Mariem Hassan, Leyoad, guitarist Nayim Alal and singer Aziza Brahim. Meanwhile, American label Rounder Records released their own compilation Starry Nights in Western Sahara in 2000.

In 2002 Mariem Hassan and Leyoad released a collaboration album, Mariem Hassan con Leyoad. Then, in 2005 Nubenegra edited Mariem Hassan first solo album, titled Deseos (Wishes). In 2009, the album Shouka (Thorn) was published. Her last work, El Aaiun egdat (El Aaiun on fire) was released in 2012.

In 2003 Nubenegra edited the album Nar (Fire) from guitarist and singer Nayim Alal.

On November 8, 2007 Tiris released the album Sandtracks on British label Sandblast Records.

In 2007, the American label Sublime Frequencies edited the album Guitar Music from Western Sahara, from the Dakhla-based band Group Doueh. In June 2009, Group Doueh released the album Treeg Salaam (Streets of Peace).

In 2008, Aziza Brahim released with the French label Reaktion her first EP, titled Mi Canto (My Singing). Her LP Mabruk with her band Gulili Mankoo is scheduled for June 2012.

See also
Aziza Brahim
Mariem Hassan
Najm Allal
Tiris

References

External links
Sample and download Sáhara, Tierra Mía
Sample and download Mariem Hassan con Leyoad
 Info, Audio & video samples
Mariem Hassan INTERVIEW
Starry Nights in Western Sahara 
Listen to starry-celebration sample
Listen to samples from Medej CD, Mariem Hassan, Nayim Alal et al at CDRoots.com
Advance of the new CD of Mariem Hassan